Clinopodium mutabile is a species of flowering plant in the family Lamiaceae. It is found only in Ecuador. Its natural habitat is subtropical or tropical dry shrubland.

References

mutabile
Flora of Ecuador
Near threatened plants
Taxonomy articles created by Polbot